Lilac beauty may refer to:

 'Lilac Beauty', a cultivar of Crocus tommasinianus
 Lilac beauty (Apeira syringaria), a moth in the family Geometridae found throughout Europe
 Lilac beauty (Salamis cacta), a butterfly in the family Nymphalidae found in Africa

Animal common name disambiguation pages